XETAR-AM (La Voz de la Sierra Tarahumara – "The Voice of the Sierra Tarahumara") is an indigenous community radio station
that broadcasts in Spanish, Tarahumara and Northern Tepehuán from Guachochi, in the Mexican state of Chihuahua. 
It is run by the Cultural Indigenist Broadcasting System (SRCI) of the National Commission for the Development of Indigenous Peoples (CDI). XETAR-AM broadcasts on the United States clear-channel frequency of 870 kHz.

External links
XETAR website

References

Radio stations in Chihuahua
Sistema de Radiodifusoras Culturales Indígenas
Sierra Madre Occidental
Radio stations established in 1982
Daytime-only radio stations in Mexico